Rangemaster may refer to:

 Rangemaster, a stove manufacturer owned by the Aga Rangemaster Group
 Dallas Rangemaster, a treble booster
 Rangemaster, an overseer of a shooting range
 Ryan Rangemaster, a late model version of the Ryan Navion airplane.